Michael Pat Murphy (12 March 1919 – 28 October 2000) was an Irish Labour Party politician. A publican before entering politics, he was first elected to Dáil Éireann as a Labour Party Teachta Dála (TD) for the Cork West constituency at the 1951 general election. He was re-elected at each subsequent election until he retired at the 1981 general election. 

From 1961 he was elected for the Cork South-West constituency. He was appointed as Parliamentary Secretary to the Minister for Agriculture by the government of  the Taoiseach Liam Cosgrave, serving from 1973 to 1977. In February 1977, he was reassigned as Parliamentary Secretary to the Minister for Fisheries, serving until May 1977.

His daughter Kate Ann married John O'Donoghue, former Fianna Fáil TD for Kerry South.

References

1919 births
2000 deaths
Labour Party (Ireland) TDs
Members of the 14th Dáil
Members of the 15th Dáil
Members of the 16th Dáil
Members of the 17th Dáil
Members of the 18th Dáil
Members of the 19th Dáil
Members of the 20th Dáil
Members of the 21st Dáil
Local councillors in County Cork
Parliamentary Secretaries of the 20th Dáil